Direk is a suburb located in the City of Salisbury, Adelaide, South Australia. It is bounded by Heaslip Road, Diment Road, Bolivar Road and the Adelaide-Port Augusta railway line.

Direk is predominantly an industrial suburb, with residential development in the southeast adjoining Salisbury North and Burton residential areas. To the north lies the RAAF Edinburgh base. Direk Primary School is in the much larger suburb of Salisbury North.

References